Olivier Carreras is a French documentary film director, producer and TV presenter.

References

Year of birth missing (living people)
French film directors
Living people
French television presenters
French film producers
French documentary filmmakers
French documentary film producers